is a passenger railway station located in the town of Ōtoyo, Nagaoka District, Kōchi Prefecture, Japan. It is operated by JR Shikoku and has the station number "D30".

Lines

Layout
The station consists of an island platform serving two tracks. By the side of the tracks, a station building serves as a waiting room. Access to the island platform is by means of a level crossing. A passing siding runs between the station building and the island platform. The station is unstaffed but a shop nearby sells some types of tickets.

Adjacent stations

History
At this time the station was operated by Japanese Government Railways, later becoming Japanese National Railways (JNR). With the privatization of JNR on 1 April 1987, control of the station passed to JR Shikoku.

Surrounding area
Yoshida Shoten (consignment of ticket sales)
Japan National Route 32

See also
 List of Railway Stations in Japan

References

External links

JR Shikoku timetable 

Railway stations in Kōchi Prefecture
Railway stations in Japan opened in 1934
Ōtoyo, Kōchi